Celso Valli (born 14 May 1950) is an Italian composer, conductor, arranger  and record producer.

Born in Bologna, Valli studied at the Conservatorio Giovanni Battista Martini. He  made his official debut collaborating with Drupi in his 1978 album Provincia. In the same years he started producing, arranging and occasionally working as a composer in a number of Italo disco projects, including Tantra, Azoto, and Passengers. Since 1979 he started collaborating with Mina, then he was producer and collaborator of some of the most successful Italian artists between 1980s and 2000s, notably Andrea Bocelli, Laura Pausini, Eros Ramazzotti, Filippa Giordano, Mango, Vasco Rossi, Matia Bazar, Raf, Giorgia, Gerardina Trovato.

References

External links
 
 
 

1950 births
Musicians from Bologna
Living people
Conservatorio Giovanni Battista Martini alumni
Italian music arrangers
Italian male conductors (music)
Italian pop musicians
Italian record producers
Italian film score composers
Italian male film score composers
21st-century Italian conductors (music)
21st-century Italian male musicians